Stoke Hall is a Grade II listed mansion on Stoke Hall Lane in the civil parish of Stoke in Cheshire East, England. The large L-shaped building dates originally from the early 17th century, but has a 19th-century appearance. It is built from red brick, in Flemish Bond, with a slate roof.

The hall originally belonged to the Minshull family, who owned the manor of Stoke in the 17th century. A disused dovecote with a bell turret in the grounds of the hall dates from the late 18th century; it is also listed at grade II.

The building was Grade II listed on 10 June 1952. The hall gives its name to the lane from which it is accessed.

See also
Listed buildings in Stoke, Cheshire East

References 

Grade II listed houses
Grade II listed buildings in Cheshire
Houses in Cheshire